Notre Dame of Marbel University also known by its acronym NDMU) is a private Catholic educational institution run by the Marist Brothers in Koronadal, South Cotabato, Philippines. It was founded in 1945 and offers pre-school, elementary, high school, college and postgraduate courses. It is the first Marist university in the Philippines since 1992, and it houses one of  largest library in Southern Mindanao, known as NDMU Library. NDMU is the only university in Koronadal City and is considered to be the premier university and the prime academic institution in the province of South Cotabato. NDMU is a member of the Notre Dame Educational Association, a group of Notre Dame Schools in the Philippines under the patronage of the Blessed Virgin Mary, also the Patroness of the University.

History and timeline
Rev. Francis McSorley, OMI, founded Notre Dame of Marbel High School immediately after World War II to cater to the education needs of the sons and daughters of the settlers of Koronadal valley. It was the first high school in the area.

1949 The first Graduation Exercises of the Notre Dame of Marbel High School (NDM) had 37 men and 16 women graduating.
1950 Br. Edmund Conrad Paradis, FMS, took over the direction of the boys, while Mother Maria Ronquillo, RVM, took care of the girls. Fr. Matthew Casey, OMI, remained as the school director.
1951 The Marist Brothers completely took over the management and ownership of the Notre Dame of Marbel from the Oblate Fathers (OMI). Br. Paradis became the director-principal of boys and girls department. The RVM Sisters left the school and the management of the girls was later taken over by the OP Sisters of Siena in the beginning of the school year 1959–1953.
1952 Bro. Paradis and Mo. Josefina Burgos, Prioress-General of the OP Sisters, made a contract to build a library and administration building using permanent materials. The cost would be shared 50-50 and to be built on the boundary of two properties. This would become the first cement hollow block building in the campus. The Dominican Sisters of Siena (OP) took over the care of the girls from the RVM Sisters, which became the ND of Marbel Girls' Department. The Marist Brothers continued to take care of the boys and known as the ND of Marbel Boys’ Department.
1954 The Brothers residence (made of cement hollow blocks) was completed and blessed by Fr. Marcy, SJ, during the annual retreat of the Brothers.
1955 Opening of the college department with course offerings in Education, Liberal Arts, Pre-Law, Pre-Nursing, Commerce and Secretarial. Br. Herbert Dumont, FMS, was its founder and first dean. The school now assumed the name Notre Dame of Marbel College, coeducational except in the high school department.
1957 The first graduation exercises of Notre Dame of Marbel College, 89 graduates: 78 CSS, 8 AA general, and 3 AA Pre-Law (56 CSS had already graduated on May 15, 1956).
1962-1964 Opening of the elementary department for boys with Br. Regis Xavier Creegan, FMS, as its first principal. The enrollees were from the Girl's Elementary first to fourth grades. The Sisters retained the fifth and sixth grades. The agreement was to phase out the girls as they graduate and to retain/enroll only boys in the future.
In 1964, the first elementary graduation has undergone under the care of the Marist Brothers with 26 boys and 15 girls graduated. These pupils started their schooling with the OP Sisters.
1965 Completion of the two-storey concrete college building, now known as SLR Hall, which houses the library, laboratories and classrooms.
1966-1967 The first time the title “President” was used to designate the head of NDMC. Brother Norman J. Roy, FMS, was conferred with such title for two consecutive years.
1967 NDMC was chosen as one of the center colleges of NDEA to start the faculty development program to train teachers of both public and private in various subject areas.
1967 Opening of the Graduate School of Education with offerings in Master of Arts in Education, major in Educational Administration. It started with 44 students; Br. Joseph Damian Teston, FMS, was its founder and first dean.
1968 First PAASCU accreditation of the three programs: Education, Commerce, Liberal Arts.
1969 First graduation exercise of the Graduate School with one candidate: Mercedes Amoroso, MA in Educational Administration.
1970 Opening of Master of Arts in Teaching: Mathematics, Biology, Physics,  Chemistry, and
Natural Science. NDMC accepted the responsibility to be the Regional Science Teaching Center (RSTC). The annex building for the RSTC offices was constructed.
1973 Opening of the Mindanao Institute for Development of School Administrators (MIDSA), a three-year scholarship grant from the Asia Foundation and the Filipinas Foundation for MA program for 31 high school administrators coming from Agusan del Norte, Agusan del Sur, Davao City, South Cotabato, Sultan Kudarat, Maguindanao, North Cotabato, and Lanao del Sur. Opening of the apprenticeship program for the training of out-of-school youth, funded by Asia Foundation (MTTP).
1975 Launching of EAMA, a 21-month masters program for 27 participants from ethnic groups from provinces of Mindanao.
1976 Started the construction of the NDMC gymnasium by MCDC. In the later part of 1976, NDMC became one of the two NDEA Regional Development Centers (RSDC). It trained teachers in Communication Arts and assisted in the textbook project of the Education Program Implementing Task Force (EDPITAF).
1978 NDMC was chosen as one of the six Notre Dame colleges in the South Cotabato region to pilot-test the Circuit Rider Program, an on-site upgrading of teachers competence through mobile teams of local subject experts in communication arts, science and mathematics. It also starts the Para-Teachers Program, an innovative program for elementary school teachers in the cultural community areas of Maguindanao, Sultan Kudarat, and South Cotabato and the resurvey of the colleges of Commerce, Education, and Liberal Arts for PAASCU accreditation.
1980 First kindergarten graduation with 72 boys graduating.
1981 Development of 15-hectare Demonstration Farm in Barangay Paraiso, Koronadal, for training, field demonstration, and practicum of the students enrolled in agriculture. It is also a dispersal center for goats to local farmers.
1982 Start of the Dairy Goat Dispersal project at the demo farm with an initial grant from OXFAM (England).
1983 Construction of a three-storey, 14-classroom college building to accommodate the growing population of the college. It was intended to house the engineering classes and lab.
1984 PAASCU resurvey of the colleges of Commerce, Liberal Arts, and Education for re-accreditation.
1986 Expansion of the NDMC demo farm to 35 hectares to meet the growing needs of agriculture students and the extension programs of the college.
1987 NDMC became the sister school of Notre Dame College of Shepparton, Australia. Two groups led by Br. Columbanus Pratt, FMS came to visit school.
1988 Hosting of NDEA Silver Jubilee Athletic Competitions. Start of the construction of the science-building complex with grant from the USAID-ASHA of the United States through the FMS Esopus Province sponsorship.
1989 Teston Hall, part of the Science Complex, which accommodated the Physics Lab, Computer Lab, Mathematics Lab, and Champagnat Hall, was ready for occupancy.
1990 Purchase of a 3.5-hectare land as a site for the elementary and high school departments in Barrio Two and a three-storey building was completed nine months later.
1991 Completion of the one-story, two-classroom building in the Demo Farm, Barangay Paraiso, Koronadal City.
1992-1993 In 1992, NDMC was granted a university status and given the name Notre Dame of Marbel University. Br. Eugene Pius Tajo, FMS became the first university president. The blessing and formal turnover of the Science Complex building to NDMU by Compex Construction was done during this year.
In 1993, the turnover of the administration of the university to a lay person with Dr. Leonor P. Pagunsan as the first woman president.
In 1994, start of the construction of the new elementary school building in Barrio 2, Koronadal, South Cotabato.
In 1996, the blessing and turnover of the new elementary school building to NDMU administration.
And in 1999, Bro. Crispin Betita, FMS took over the presidency of the university from Dr. Pagunsan, who completed her six-year term as president.
2001 CHED grants full autonomy to ND Marbel University, one among the 30 schools throughout the country and one among the four in Mindanao.
In 2006, Brother Wilfredo E. Lubrico, FMS became the University President after his presidency at Notre Dame of Dadiangas University
In 2018 - 2019, NDMU applied with the Legal Education Board (LEB) and Supreme Court permission to offer a Bachelor of Laws course. LEB granted NDMU to open a Law School in the City of Koronadal which is the first Law School in the City and in South Cotabato.
In 2019, the blessing and the opening of the three-storey building for the Senior High School Department which was named as the Montagne Hall during the Celebration of the Year of the Youth. Groundbreaking ceremonies also happened for Under Construction New Marista Building (SHS Cafeteria and Auditorium), and the NDMU IBED Multi Purpose Gymnasium, and Business and Registrar Extension for Senior High School. Among present where South Cotabato Governor Reynaldo Tamayo Jr, City of Koronadal Mayor Eliordo Ogena, and DEPED Region 12 Director Allan Farnazo who lead the blessing, cutting of ribbon and ground breaking ceremonies.
In 2019, NDMU started the 75th Diamond Jubillee celebration countdown with the Marist Hope Center for Justice and Good Governance and the Announcement of the NDMU IBED Chapel Construction.
On January 25, 2021, Brother Wilfredo Lubrico, FMS died while in office as the University President which made it the first time a sitting University President died while in office. Funeral and necrological services where held in the University Gym. Bro. Dominador Santiago, FMS became the Acting President until May 31, 2021.
On June 1, 2021, Bro. Paterno Corpus, FMS officially became the President of NDMU and Bro. Noel T. Fernandez, FMS became the NDMU - IBED Director, both Marist Brothers came from NDDU.

Marist Brothers

The Marist Brothers of the Schools (FMS), commonly known as the Marist Brothers, is a congregation of men who devote their lives to Christian education throughout the world, running Catholic schools or otherwise for the training and guidance of youth.

The congregation was founded in France in 1817 by Saint Marcellin Champagnat, who realized the values of Catholic Education in schools wherein God, the Blessed Virgin, Catholic Doctrine, and morality are part of the daily program.

The greatest concentration of Marist Brothers is in France, Australia, Spain, Brazil, Mexico, Canada, The United States, Cairo, Nigeria, Zimbabwe, Argentina, New Zealand, Belgium, and Italy. In Asia, The Marist Brothers are in South Korea, Japan, Taiwan, Guam, Hong Kong, Malaysia, Pakistan, Sri Lanka, and the Philippines.

The Marists are sure of their future in the Philippines for already many Filipinos have become Marist Brothers and more young men are now in training in the Aspirancy in Lagao, General Santos City, in the novitiate in Tamontaka, Cotabato City and in the Scholasticate in Marikina, Metro Manila.

Presently, the Filipino Marist Brothers administer 2 Universities and 1 college: Notre Dame of Dadiangas University, Notre Dame of Marbel University, and Notre Dame of Kidapawan College. It also runs seven high schools and four elementary schools. These schools are located in Kidapawan City, City of Koronadal, Marikina, Cotabato City, General Santos City, and Jolo.

Facilities
Library (Largest in Mindanao)
Cafe Marista
Bro. Renato Cruz Hall (New Building)
Administrative Building
Alumni Center
Museum
SMC Hall & Gymnasium
Clinic
NDMU Diagnostic Laboratory
Marist Mansion
HRM Laboratory Building
Nursing Laboratory
Crime Laboratory (Doherty Building)
Science and Technology Building (Omer and Teston Hall – Computer Laboratories)
Lorenzo Hall
Dumont Hall
Creegan Hall
CBA Recreation Area
St. Marcellin Champagnat Hall
4 Audio Visual Rooms
NDMU Chapel
SMART SWEEP Laboratory
Athletics and Fitness Center
National Aeronautics and Space Administration's (NASA's) Sunphotometer and Weather Station (Omer Hall Rooftop)

Colleges
College of Education
College of Business Administration (formerly College of Business)
College of Engineering & Technology (formerly College of Science and Technology)
College of Arts and Sciences (inclusion of the Health Sciences Department)
Graduate School
College of Law
Champagnat Community College (CCC) TechVoc Program, TESDA and Community Extension Program

Curriculum

Postgraduate
 Ph.D. in Educational Management
 Ph.D. in Science Education (Chemistry and Physics)

Graduate
Master in Education (Biology, Chemistry, Educational Management, Filipino, Guidance & Counseling, Mathematics and Physics)
Master of Arts in Library Science
Master of Science in Biology, Chemistry, Crop Science, Mathematics, Physics (Thesis)
Master of Science in Rural Extension and Development
Master in Business Administration (Thesis and Non – Thesis)
Master in Public Administration (Thesis and Non – Thesis)
Master of Science in Information Technology (Non – Thesis)
Master in Biology, Chemistry, English, Information Technology, Mathematics, Physics (Non – Thesis)

Law School
 Bachelor of Laws (LLB)

Five-Year Courses

 BS Accountancy
 BS Civil Engineering
 BS Computer Engineering
 BS Electronics and Communications Engineering
 BS Electrical Engineering

Four-Year Courses
AB Philosophy
AB Political Science
AB Psychology
BS Elementary Education (Area of Concentration: General, Pre-School)
BS Secondary Education (Area of Concentration: Biological Sciences, English, Filipino, Mathematics, MAPEH, Physical Sciences)
BS Accounting Technology
BS Biology
BS Chemistry
BS Business Administration (Majors in: Financial Management, Marketing Management, Human Resource Development Management)
BS Computer Science
BS Information Technology
BS Criminology
BS Hotel and Restaurant Management
BS Medical Technology
BS Nursing
BS Environmental Science
BS Social Work

Three-Year Courses
Associate in Industrial Technology

Two-Year Courses
Diploma in Computer Technology
Associate in Computer Technology
Associate in Hotel and Restaurant Management
Associate in Business Administration

Special Programs
Expanded Tertiary Education Equivalency & Accreditation Program (ETEEAP)
Champagnat E – Skills & Technical Program (CeSTEP)

IBED Campus

The Notre Dame of Marbel University – Integrated Basic Education Department Campus is located in Purok Masikap, Barangay Sto. Nino, City of Koronadal and offers the following:

Kindergarten
Elementary & Junior High School Department
Senior High School Department

Infrastructure
Kindergarten Building
Elementary Building with Quadrangle Field
Junior High School Building with Quadrangle Field
Montagne Hall - Senior High School Building
Science Building (JHS & SHS)
TLE Hall
Elementary Canteen
Elementary and JHS Volleyball Grounds
Soccer Field with Reviewing Stand
JHS Student's Center
SHS Cafeteria and Engr. Orlando Batallones Event Hall
NDMU - IBED Gymnasium

Gates
Elementary Gate (Depita Street, City of Koronadal)
High School Gate (IBED Private Road, City of Koronadal)
Gymnasium Gate (Balmores Street, City of Koronadal)

Under Construction Infrastructure

NDMU IBED 75th Year Diamond Jubillee Chapel
NDMU IBED Aquatic Center (Indoor Olympic Size Swimming Pool)

Demolished
JHS Canteen (For the Entrance of the NDMU IBED Gym)

Proposed
NDMU - IBED Business Complex fronting National Highway

NDMU Farm
NDMU has a farm located at Brgy. Paraiso, City of Koronadal and includes the following:
Recollection House
Two one-storey buildings
12 hectares of land with crops of mango, rice and corn for agriculture-related courses

NDMU Complex
The NDMU Complex comprises the following:
 NDMU Main Complex comprises a two-storey building that houses Internet cafes, pharmacies, clinics and offices
 NDMU Clinical and Diagnostic Laboratory, officially opened December 2005, it is a clinical and diagnostic lab for health sciences students
 NDMU E-biz Building houses a 24-hour RCBC E-Biz Bank
 Marian Building is a two-storey building that has pharmacies, offices and stores
 NDMU Marist Center for Hope and Good Governance - Non Profit and Non Stock Organization for the protection of the Environment and Indigenous Peoples in South Cotabato

They are along Alunan Avenue, in front of South Cotabato Sports Complex (SMRAA) and DepEd South Cotabato Division.

Presidents

2021 – Present Bro. Paterno C. Corpus, FMS 
2021 – 2021 Acting Bro. Dominador A. Santiago, FMS 
2006 – 2021 Bro. Wilfredo E. Lubrico, FMS 
1999 – 2006 Bro. Crispin P. Betita, FMS 
1993 – 1999 Dr. Leonor P. Pagunsan  
1989 – 1993 Bro. Eugene Pius Tajo, FMS  
1985 – 1989 Bro. Manuel P. Uluan, FMS  
1980 – 1985 Bro. Wenceslao Calimpon, FMS  
1976 – 1980 Bro. Renato Cruz, FMS  
1973 – 1976 Bro. Agustin Cabrera, FMS  
1970 – 1973 Bro. Paul Johannes Meuten, FMS  
1966 – 1970 Bro. Damian Teston, FMS  
1961 – 1966 Bro. Henry Joseph Ruiz, FMS  
1958 – 1961 Bro. Herbert Daniel Dumont, FMS  
1957 – 1958 Bro. Joseph Damian Teston, FMS  
1952 – 1957 Bro. Herbert Daniel Dumont, FMS

Other Notre Dame Schools in the Philippines 
 Notre Dame University - Cotabato City (NDU)
 Notre Dame of Dadiangas University (NDDU)
 Notre Dame of Jolo College (NDJC)
 Notre Dame of Kidapawan College (NDKC)
 Notre Dame of Midsayap College (NDMC)
 Notre Dame of Tacurong College (NDTC)
 Notre Dame of Greater Manila

References

External links
 

Marist Brothers schools
Universities and colleges in South Cotabato
Catholic universities and colleges in the Philippines
Catholic elementary schools in the Philippines
Catholic secondary schools in the Philippines
Notre Dame Educational Association
Education in Koronadal